Lamékaha is the name of three clustered villages in northern Ivory Coast. They are designated Lamékaha 1, Lamékaha 2, and Lamékaha 3. The villages are in the sub-prefecture of Koumbala, Ferkessédougou Department, Tchologo Region, Savanes District.

Lamékaha was a commune until March 2012, when it became one of 1126 communes nationwide that were abolished.

Notes

Former communes of Ivory Coast
Populated places in Savanes District
Populated places in Tchologo